Bösendorfer may refer to:

Bösendorfer, a piano manufacturing company
Bösendorfer-Saal, a former concert hall in Vienna
Ignaz Bösendorfer  (1796–1859), founder of the piano manufacturing company
Imperial Bösendorfer (piano)